Thiotepa (INN), sold under the brand name Tepadina, is a medication used to treat cancer.

Thiotepa is an organophosphorus compound with the formula (C2H4N)3PS. It is an analog of N,N',N-triethylenephosphoramide|N,N′,N′′''-triethylenephosphoramide (TEPA), which contains tetrahedral phosphorus and is structurally akin to phosphate. It is manufactured by heating aziridine with thiophosphoryl chloride.

Medical uses 
Thiotepa is indicated for use in combination with other chemotherapy agents to treat cancer. This can be with or without total body irradiation (TBI), as a conditioning treatment prior to allogeneic or autologous hematopoietic progenitor cell transplantation (HPCT) in hematological diseases in adults and children. These diseases include Hodgkin's disease and leukaemia. Thiotepa is also used with high-dose chemotherapy with HPCT support to treat certain solid tumors in adult and children.

Thiotepa is used in the palliation of many neoplastic diseases. The best results are found in the treatment of adenocarcinoma of the breast, adenocarcinoma of the ovary, papillary thyroid cancer and bladder cancer. Thiotepa is used to control intracavitary effusions caused by serosal neoplastic deposits.

Intravesical use 
Thiotepa is used as intravesical chemotherapy in bladder cancer.

It may be used prophylactically to prevent seeding of tumor cells at cystoscopic biopsy; as an adjunctive agent at the time of biopsy; or as a therapeutic agent to prevent recurrence after cystoscopic resection of bladder tumor (transurethral resection of bladder tumor, TURBT). Efficacy in tumor control may reach 55%. The main toxicity of this therapy is bone marrow suppression due to systemic absorption of the drug.

Side effects 
The main side effect of thiotepa is bone marrow suppression resulting in leukopenia, thrombocytopenia and anemia. Liver and lung toxicity may also occur.

History 
Thiotepa was developed by the American Cyanamid company in the early 1950s and reported to media outlets in 1953. In 1959, thiotepa was registered with the Food and Drug Administration (FDA) as a drug therapy for several solid cancers.

On January 29, 2007, the European Medicines Agency (EMA) designated thiotepa as an orphan drug. On April 2, 2007, the United States FDA designated thiotepa as a conditioning treatment for use prior to hematopoietic stem cell transplantation. Adienne Pharma & Biotech (Italy), the owner of thiotepa (Tepadina) applied for these designations.

References

External links 
 

Alkylating antineoplastic agents
Aziridines
Cancer treatments
IARC Group 1 carcinogens
Organophosphoric amides
Orphan drugs
Thiophosphoryl compounds